Nimet Özgüç (15 March 1916 – 23 December 2015) was a Turkish archaeologist. In her era, she and her husband were the dominant Turkish academics and archaeologists. She was made an honorary member of the Turkish Academy of Sciences in 1996 and was awarded the Grand Prize of the Ministry of Culture and Tourism in 2010 for her contributions to archaeology in the country.

Early life
Nimet Dinçer was born on 15 March 1916 Adapazarı, Turkey. Her father was a public official and her mother raised the six children. Dinçer continued her education at Ankara University, as one of the first students in the department of Ancient History of the Language and History faculty, which had been established in 1935. She graduated with a bachelor's degree in 1940.

Career
Immediately upon her graduation, Dinçer, who was encouraged by Afet İnan, began working as an assistant teacher of history at Ankara University, while she continued with her graduate studies. Around 1941, she began working on excavations in the Samsun Province including sites at Dündartepe,  near Kavak and Tekkeköy. Studying with Hans Gustav Güterbock, she completed her thesis, Anadolu Damga Mühürleri (Anatolian Stamp Seals) in 1943, earning her doctorate in 1944, and that same year, married a fellow archaeologist, Tahsin Özgüç. Along with her husband, she began working on numerous excavations, including the survey of Elbistan in 1947 for the Turkish Historical Society. In a mound known as Karahöyük they discovered an inscription in Hieroglyphic Luwian on a stele describing the fall of the Hittite Empire. The following year, the couple were again sent by the Historical Society to excavate Kültepe near Kayseri. The site was one of the most important archaeological sites in Turkey, yielding tablets and artifacts which documented its place as a major trading city during the period from 2000-1700BC for the Anatolian plateau.

In 1949, Özgüç became associate professor at Ankara University and she became a full professor in 1958. She continued her work with her husband at Kültepe, and on such excavations as Frakdin (1954) and Altintepe (1959), until 1962, when she began her own project examining the Hittite center at Acemhöyük near Niğde. In 1962, she proved that an ivory artifacts presented to the Metropolitan Museum of Art in 1930, had originated in Acemhöyük.

She discovered significant evidence that the site was one of the two main towns in the region and an important cultural center in the Early Bronze Age, through the transition to the Middle Bronze Age. She was honored with the Guillaume Bude Medal of the Collège de France in 1980.

Özgüç retired from Ankara University in 1984, but continued her scientific work and publishing. She was granted an honorary membership to the Turkish Academy of Sciences in 1996 and was a co-awardee with Halet Çambel of the Grand Prize of the Ministry of Culture and Tourism of 2010 for her contributions to archaeology in the country. The award was presented by President Abdullah Gül on 9 February 2011. That same year, a book, Cumhuriyetin Çocukları—Arkeolojinin Büyükleri: Nimet Özgüç – Tahsin Özgüç (The Children of the Republic—The Elders of Archaeology: Nimet Özgüç – Tahsin Özgüç) was published by Nursel Duruel. The book paid homage to the importance of the Özgüçs in establishing the field of archaeology in the country.

Death and legacy
Özgüç died on 23 December 2015 in Ankara and her funeral was held at Kocatepe Mosque on 25 December.

Selected works

References

Citations

Bibliography

Further reading

1916 births
2015 deaths
People from Ankara
Ankara University alumni
Academic staff of Ankara University
Turkish women archaeologists
Turkish archaeologists
20th-century archaeologists
21st-century archaeologists
21st-century Turkish women writers
20th-century Turkish women writers
20th-century Turkish writers